Roberto Pasca (2 April 1821, in Naples - 11 August 1897, in Naples) was a brigadier in the navy of the Kingdom of the Two Sicilies. He is most notable for signing the "Capitulation for the surrender of piazza di Gaeta" in 1861 on behalf of Francis II of the Two Sicilies.

Naval officers of the Kingdom of the Two Sicilies
1821 births
1897 deaths